Lapel is a town in Stony Creek Township, Madison County, Indiana, United States. It is part of the Anderson, Indiana Metropolitan Statistical Area. The population was 2,068 at the 2010 census.

History
Lapel was platted in 1876 by David Conrad and Samuel Busby when the railroad was extended to that point. The name Lapel was chosen because the railroad caused the town to be in the shape of a man’s coat lapel.

Geography
Lapel is located at  (40.068006, -85.847478).

Demographics

2010 census
As of the census of 2010, there were 2,068 people, 803 households, and 578 families living in the town. The racial makeup of the town was 97.7% White, 0.2% African American, 0.3% Native American, 0.2% Asian, 0.3% from other races, and 1.3% from two or more races. Hispanic or Latino of any race were 0.8% of the population.

There were 803 households, of which 38.9% had children under the age of 18 living with them, 53.3% were married couples living together, 13.8% had a female householder with no husband present, 4.9% had a male householder with no wife present, and 28.0% were non-families. 23.3% of all households were made up of individuals, and 10.3% had someone living alone who was 65 years of age or older. The average household size was 2.58 and the average family size was 2.99.

The median age in the town was 37.3 years. 27.9% of residents were under the age of 18; 7.5% were between the ages of 18 and 24; 26.2% were from 25 to 44; 25.9% were from 45 to 64; and 12.4% were 65 years of age or older. The gender makeup of the town was 48.3% male and 51.7% female.

2000 census
As of the census of 2000, there were 1,855 people, 749 households, and 534 families living in the town. The racial makeup of the town was 98.87% White, 0.05% African American, 0.27% Native American, 0.05% Asian, 0.05% Pacific Islander, 0.16% from other races, and 0.54% from two or more races. Hispanic or Latino of any race were 0.43% of the population.

There were 749 households, out of which 34.6% had children under the age of 18 living with them, 55.3% were married couples living together, 12.8% had a female householder with no husband present, and 28.6% were non-families. 26.0% of all households were made up of individuals, and 11.9% had someone living alone who was 65 years of age or older. The average household size was 2.48 and the average family size was 2.96.

In the town, the population was spread out, with 27.5% under the age of 18, 7.9% from 18 to 24, 30.9% from 25 to 44, 21.1% from 45 to 64, and 12.6% who were 65 years of age or older. The median age was 35 years. For every 100 females, there were 94.2 males. For every 100 females age 18 and over, there were 86.7 males.

The median income for a household in the town was $41,389, and the median income for a family was $48,083. Males had a median income of $38,854 versus $24,727 for females. The per capita income for the town was $18,887. About 4.8% of families and 5.7% of the population were below the poverty line, including 7.7% of those under age 18 and none of those age 65 or over.

Education

Lapel contains an elementary school, a junior high school and a high school. A new high school building was finished in December 2007. Lapel schools are a part of the Frankton-Lapel School Corporation in central Madison County.

Lapel has a public library, a branch of the Anderson Public Library.

References

External links
 Town website
 Town Text Alert System
 Town Park Department
 Town Planning Department
 Lapel High School

Towns in Madison County, Indiana
Towns in Indiana